Andreas von Österreich, Margrave of Burgau, also known as Andrew of Austria (15 June 1558 at Březnice Castle in Březnice, Bohemia – 12 November 1600 in Rome) was a cardinal, Bishop of Constance and of Brixen. He belonged to the Austrian nobility, descending from its ruling dynasty, the House of Habsburg.

Youth 
Andrew and his younger brother Charles grew up at Bresnitz Castle in Březnice, Bohemia, and later at Ambras Castle in Innsbruck, Tyrol.  The marriage of their parents, Ferdinand II, Archduke of Austria and Philippine Welser, was morganatic.  This meant that the brothers were not considered members of the Habsburg dynasty and could not use their father's title, Archduke of Austria, bearing instead that of Margrave of Burgau.

His father decided that Andrew should have a career in the clergy.  In March 1574, Andrew travelled to Rome, where Pope Gregory XIII made him a cardinal, with Santa Maria Nuova as his titular church.  Andrew was only 17 years old, his father having obtained the position for him.

Later life 
Andrew was Abbot of Murbach from 1587 until his death.  From 1589, he was also Bishop of Constance and from 1589 Bishop of Brixen. In 1598 and 1599, he briefly served as acting Governor General of the Habsburg Netherlands while Archduke Albert VII travelled to Spain to marry Infanta Isabella Clara Eugenia.

In 1600, he traveled to Rome to celebrate the Jubilee, afterwards visiting Naples. On his return journey, he fell ill and died after receiving the last rites from the Pope himself. He was buried in Santa Maria dell'Anima in Rome.  His marble funeral monument in the church was completed by the sculptors Gillis van den Vliete and Nicolas Mostaert around 1600 and includes a portrait of Andrew kneeling in prayer.

Issue 
Andrew had two illegitimate children, Hans-Georg Degli Abizzi (b. 1583) and Susanna Degli Abizzi (1584–1653). They were raised by his brother Charles.

Notes

References 
 
 Margot Rauch: Karl von Burgau und Kardinal Andreas von Österreich, in: Philippine Welser & Anna Caterina Gonzaga: Die Gemahlinnen Erzherzog Ferdinands II., catalogue for an exhibition, Innsbruck, 1998
 Margot Rauch: Kardinal Andreas von Österreich, in: Ambras — Das Schloss der Philippine Welser, permanent presentation, Innsbruck, 2007
 Eduard Widmoser: Kardinal Andreas von Österreich, Markgraf von Burgau (1558-1600), in: Lebensbilder aus dem Bayerischen Schwaben, vol. 4, Munich, 1955, p. 249-259.
 Constantin von Wurzbach: , in: Biographisches Lexikon des Kaiserthums Oesterreich

External links 

 
 Short biography

1558 births
1600 deaths
16th-century Austrian cardinals
Bishops of Brixen
Roman Catholic bishops of Constance
16th-century House of Habsburg
Margraves of Germany
House of Welser
Prince-bishops in the Holy Roman Empire
Sons of monarchs